The International Towing & Recovery Hall of Fame & Museum features restored antique wreckers and equipment from the tow truck industry. Located in Chattanooga, Tennessee, the museum also displays related toys, tools, equipment, and pictorial histories.

The collection of tow trucks at the museum ranges from the early days of the automobile and includes miscellaneous antique toys and memorabilia.

The International Towing and Recovery Museum was dedicated in October 1995 and is a non-profit organization.

References

External links
International Towing & Recovery Hall Of Fame and Museum

Automobile museums in Tennessee
Museums in Chattanooga, Tennessee
1995 establishments in Tennessee
Museums established in 1995